Employable Me may refer to:

 Employable Me, a 2016 British TV series on BBC Two
 Employable Me (Canadian TV series), a 2017 Canadian TV series
 Employable Me (Australian TV series), a 2018 Australian TV series